The Supreme Court of Justice of Colombia in Bogotá is the highest judicial body in civil and penal matters and issues of criminal and civil procedure in Colombia. The Supreme Court of Colombia is the highest authority in regard to the interpretation of administrative law, constitutional law, and the administration of the judiciary.

The court consists of twenty three judges, elected by the same institution in list conformed by the Superior Council of the Judiciary for individual terms of eight years. The court meets at the Palace of Justice in the Bolívar Square of Bogotá.

History
After the Colombian first declaration of independence from Spain on 20 July 1810, a number of independent States like Tunja (1811), Antioquia (1812), Cartagena de Indias (1812) and Cundinamarca (1812) were established. Each State had its own body in charge of the administration of justice. Later, when these States established the Provincias Unidas de la Nueva Granada (United Provinces of New Granada), on 23 September 1814, the Alto Tribunal de Justicia (High Tribunal of Justice) was established. In 1819, the Republic of Colombia (the Gran Colombia) was born. A Court was created according to the provisions its Constitution of 30 August 1821, named Alta Corte de Justicia (High Court of Justice). In 1830, the Gran Colombia was dissolved and the Republic of New Granada was formed. As per the provisions of its Constitution of 29 February 1832, the Corte Suprema de Justicia (Supreme Court of Justice) was established. On 20 May 1853, it became the Corte Suprema de la Nación (Supreme Court of the Nation). In 1858, the Grenadine Confederation was founded. On adoption of its Constitution of 22 May 1858, the Courte Suprema (Supreme Court) became the body in charge of the administration of justice. In 1863, the Grenadine Confederation was replaced by the Estados Unidos de Colombia (United States of Colombia). On adoption of its Constitution of 8 May 1863, the Corte Suprema Federal (Supreme Federal Court) was established. Finally, after the establishment of the República de Colombia (Republic of Colombia) and on adoption of its Constitution of 4 August 1886, the body was renamed as the present, the Corte Suprema de Justicia (Supreme Court of Justice) on 3 September 1886. Its first President was Rito Antonio Martínez.

In 1985 in the Palace of Justice siege, members of the M-19 guerrilla group took over the Palace of Justice, and held the Supreme Court hostage, intending to put President Belisario Betancur on trial. Hours later, after a military raid, the incident left all the rebels and 11 of the 25 Supreme Court Justices dead.

Current Judges

President: Luis Antonio Hernández Barbosa 
Vice-president: Aroldo Wilson Quiroz Monsalvo

Civil and Agrarian Cassation Chamber
President: Luis Armando Tolosa Villabona
Hilda González Neira
Aroldo Wilson Quiroz Monsalvo
Francisco Ternera Barrios
Álvaro Fernando García Restrepo
Luis Alonso Rico Puerta
Octavio Augusto Tejeiro Duque

Labor Cassation Chamber
President: Fernando Castillo Cadena
Jorge Mauricio Burgos
Rigoberto Echeverri Bueno
Clara Cecilia Dueñas Quevedo
Luis Gabriel Miranda Buelvas
Jorge Luis Quiroz
Gerardo Botero Zuluaga

Penal Cassation Chamber
President: Luis Antonio Hernández Barbosa
Eyder Patiño Cabrera
Luis Guillermo Salazar Otero
Fernando Alberto Castro Caballero
Gustavo Malo Fernández
Patricia Salazar Cuéllar
José Francisco Acuña Vizcaya
José Luis Barceló Camacho
 Eugenio Fernández Carlier

References

 Colombian Judicial Branch of Power Margot Hernandez
 Colombian Judicial Branch of power; judges

External links
 The Supreme Court of Colombia website

Constitutional law
Colombia
 
Government buildings in Colombia
1886 establishments in Colombia
Courts and tribunals established in 1886